John Cowburn Beavan, Baron Ardwick (9 April 1910 – 18 August 1994) was a British journalist.

Early life and education
Beavan was a son of Silas Morgan Beavan (of Welsh origin and a grocer, according to censuses) and Emily Esther (née Hussey); and was educated at Manchester Grammar School.

Career
Beavan was reporter of the Manchester Evening News, becoming its editor in 1943. Between 1946 and 1955, he was London editor of The Guardian. For two years, 1960 to 1962, he was editor of the Daily Herald, then becoming political advisor to the Mirror Group, a post he retained until 1976. He was a Labour Member of the European Parliament from 1975 to 1979.

On 16 January 1970, he was created a life peer as Baron Ardwick, of Barnes in the London Borough of Richmond upon Thames.

Personal life
He married Gladys Jones in 1934 by whom he had two children. By Anne Symonds, a BBC World Service journalist, he was also the father of Matthew Symonds. Symonds' daughter Carrie is the spouse of the former Prime Minister of the United Kingdom Boris Johnson, a Conservative.

Arms

References

1910 births
1994 deaths
People educated at Manchester Grammar School
The Guardian journalists
Ardwick
Labour Party (UK) MEPs
MEPs for the United Kingdom 1973–1979
Life peers created by Elizabeth II